The 2013 Dollar General 300 Powered by Coca-Cola was the 26th stock car race of the 2013 NASCAR Nationwide Series and the 13th iteration of the event. The race was held on Saturday, September 14, 2013, in Joliet, Illinois, at Chicagoland Speedway, a 1.5 miles (2.41 km) tri-oval speedway. The race took the scheduled 200 laps to complete. At race's end, Kyle Busch, driving for Joe Gibbs Racing, would dominate the race to win his 61st career NASCAR Nationwide Series and his 10th win of the season. To fill out the podium, Joey Logano and Sam Hornish Jr., both driving for Penske Racing, would finish second and third, respectively.

Background 

Chicagoland Speedway is a 1.5 miles (2.41 km) tri-oval speedway in Joliet, Illinois, southwest of Chicago. The speedway opened in 2001 and currently hosts NASCAR racing. Until 2011, the speedway also hosted the IndyCar Series, recording numerous close finishes including the closest finish in IndyCar history. The speedway is owned and operated by International Speedway Corporation and located adjacent to Route 66 Raceway.

Entry list 

 (R) denotes rookie driver.
 (i) denotes driver who is ineligible for series driver points.

Practice

First practice 
The first practice session was held on Friday, September 13, at 1:40 PM CST, and would last for one hour and 15 minutes.

Second and final practice 
The second and final practice session, sometimes referred to as Happy Hour, was held on Friday, September 13, at 5:35 PM EST, and would last for one hour and 15 minutes.

Qualifying 
Qualifying was held on Saturday, September 14, at 11:05 AM CST. Each driver would have two laps to set a fastest time; the fastest of the two would count as their official qualifying lap.

Three drivers would fail to qualify: Josh Wise, Carl Long, and Morgan Shepherd.

Full qualifying results

Race results

Standings after the race 

Drivers' Championship standings

Note: Only the first 10 positions are included for the driver standings.

References 

2013 NASCAR Nationwide Series
NASCAR races at Chicagoland Speedway
September 2013 sports events in the United States
2013 in sports in Illinois